Bang Bang is a 2011 drama, gangster film directed and written by Byron Q. It stars Thai Ngo, David Huynh, Jessika Van, Wally Randolph, Vanna Fut, Kitty Chu and others. It premiered at the 2011 Los Angeles Asian Pacific Film Festival from Visual Communications, where it won the Best First Feature Award. It has also been commented to be influenced by the French New Wave films, as Director Jean-Pierre Gorin was a teacher of the film's director Byron Q while at UCSD.

Plot
A story about a youth named Justin (Thai Ngo) who grows up on the streets of San Diego, and who dreams of becoming a rapper. Meanwhile, he befriends a parachute kid Taiwanese gangster named Charlie (David Huynh) and deals with other gang leaders such as Rocky (Wally Randolph or Walter Wong).

Awards
Best First Feature, 2011 Los Angeles Asian Pacific Film Festival

Nominations
Hollywood Music in Media Awards (HMMA), Alexis Grapsas
Jury Award, Best Narrative Feature Film, 2012 San Francisco International Asian American Film Festival (now CAAMFest)

References

External links
Bang Bang on IMDb

2011 films
Films about Chinese Americans
Films about Taiwanese Americans
American independent films
2010s English-language films
Asian-American drama films
2011 independent films
2010s American films